Jan Lisowski (born 23 September 1952) is a Polish weightlifter. He competed in the men's light heavyweight event at the 1980 Summer Olympics.

References

1952 births
Living people
Polish male weightlifters
Olympic weightlifters of Poland
Weightlifters at the 1980 Summer Olympics
Sportspeople from Olsztyn
20th-century Polish people